The Big East River is a river in Muskoka District and Nipissing District in Northeastern Ontario, Canada. The river is in the Great Lakes Basin, is a left tributary of the Muskoka River, and flows from Algonquin Provincial Park to Huntsville.

Course
The Big East River begins at East End Lake in Algonquin Provincial Park in geographic Hunter Township, Nipissing District. It loops east and south to Red Lake in geographic Peck Township, turns southwest to West Harry Lake, then leaves the lake southwest over West Harry Lake Dam, through the Big Cedar Chutes, and enters geographic Finlayson Township. The river passes from Algonquin Provincial Park into Big East River Provincial Park, heads over Finlayson Lake Dam and through the Finlayson Rapids, and enters Muskoka District at geographic Sinclair Township in the incorporated township of Lake of Bays. It continues southwest through the McBrien Rapids to Distress Lake, where it takes in the right tributary Tonawanda Creek, over Distress Dam, and through McArthur Chute. The river leaves Big East River Provincial Park, enters geographic Chaffey Township in the town of Huntsville, passes the Dyer Memorial on the right bank near the settlement of Williamsport, and enters a section of oxbows and loops. It passes Arrowhead Provincial Park on the right bank, takes in the right tributary Little East River, flows under Ontario Highway 11, and reaches its mouth at Lake Vernon. Lake Vernon flows via the North Branch Muskoka River, then the Moon River and Musquash River to Lake Huron.

Tributaries
Little East River (right)
Beaver Creek (right)
Rebecca Creek (left)
Raft Creek (right)
Tonawanda Creek (right)
Bear Creek (right)
Greenish Creek (right)
Cripple Creek (right)
Tasso Creek (left)
Beanpod Creek (right)
McRaney Creek (right)
Mink Creek (left)
Lulu Creek (right)
Lupus Creek (left)
Otterpaw Creek (right)

See also
List of rivers of Ontario

References

Sources

Rivers of Muskoka District
Rivers of Nipissing District